Events in the year 1180 in Japan.

Incumbents
Monarch: Takakura and Antoku

Events
Late spring - The Genpei War begins
June - The Imperial capital moves from Heian-kyō to Fukuhara-kyō

References

 
 
Japan
Years of the 12th century in Japan